Several ships of the Royal Navy have been named HMS Nautilus, after the Greek word for a sailor, including:

  was a 16-gun sloop launched in 1762 and put up for sale in 1780
  was a 16-gun sloop launched in 1784 and wrecked in 1799. All 125 men of her crew were saved.
  was an 18-gun sloop launched in 1804 and wrecked in 1807. 
  was an 18-gun  launched in 1807 and broken up in 1823
  was a 10-gun  launched in 1830. She became a training ship in 1852, was hulked in 1872 and broken up in 1878
  was an 8-gun training brig launched in 1879 and sold in 1905
  was a  launched in 1910. She was renamed HMS Grampus in 1913 and was sold in 1920
  was a submarine launched in 1914. She was renamed HMS N1 in 1918 and was sold in 1922

See also
Ships named Nautilus
 was launched in 1806 by the Bombay Dockyard for the naval arm of the British East India Company. Nautilus was wrecked in 1834 on the Malabar Coast.

Citations and references
CitationsReferences'''
 
 

Royal Navy ship names